Polymesoda caroliniana, or the Carolina marsh clam, is a species of bivalve mollusc in the family Cyrenidae. It can be found along the Atlantic coast of North America, ranging from Virginia to Texas.

References

Cyrenidae
Marine fauna of North America
Molluscs of the Atlantic Ocean
Fauna of the Caribbean
Fauna of the Southeastern United States
Biota of the Gulf of Mexico
Bivalves described in 1801
Taxa named by Louis Augustin Guillaume Bosc